"Out of the Woods" is a song by American singer-songwriter Taylor Swift, taken from her fifth studio album, 1989 (2014). Swift wrote and produced the song with Jack Antonoff. With lyrics inspired by a failed relationship and the ensuing anxieties that Swift experienced, "Out of the Woods" is a synth-pop song with elements of indietronica and features heavy synthesizers, looping drums, and layered background vocals.

Big Machine Records made the song available for download on October 14, 2014, as a promotional single for 1989. Swift premiered the music video for "Out of the Woods" on ABC's Dick Clark's New Year's Rockin' Eve on December 31, 2015; the video depicts Swift struggling to escape from a magical forest. The song was released to US pop and hot adult contemporary radio as the album's sixth single on January 18, 2016, by Big Machine in partnership with Republic Records.

Music critics praised "Out of the Woods" for its 1980s-influenced production and narrative lyrics offering emotional engagement. The song peaked at number 18 on the US Billboard Hot 100 and was certified platinum by the Recording Industry Association of America (RIAA). It also reached the top 20 of charts in Australia, Canada, and New Zealand. Swift performed the song on television shows such as Good Morning America, and included it in the set list of the 1989 World Tour (2015).

Background and production
Taylor Swift had been known as a country singer-songwriter until her fourth studio album Red, which was released in October 2012. Red incorporates various pop and rock styles, transcending the country sound of her previous releases. Swift began writing her fifth studio album, 1989, in mid-2013, when she was on the Red Tour. Inspired by 1980s synth-pop, she conceived 1989 as her first "official pop album" that transformed her image from country to pop. On 1989, Swift enlisted new producers including Jack Antonoff, who produced two songs for the standard edition—"Out of the Woods" and "I Wish You Would", and the bonus track "You Are In Love" for the deluxe edition; Antonoff had worked with Swift on "Sweeter than Fiction", a 1980s new wave-influenced song recorded by Swift for the soundtrack of One Chance (2013).

For "Out of the Woods", Antonoff envisioned the song to feature a 1980s sound with a modern twist. He used a Yamaha DX7 synthesizer to create most parts of the song, and a Minimoog Voyager for the refrain, which brought forth an "extremely modern" sound that he desired. He edited his background vocals and layered them over looping drums. After completing the instrumental, Antonoff sent it to Swift when she was on a plane. Swift sent him a voice memo containing the lyrics roughly 30 minutes later; it was the first time Swift wrote the lyrics to an existing track. According to the liner notes of 1989, "Out of the Woods" was recorded by Laura Sisk, assisted by Brendan Morawski, at Jungle City Studios in New York City; and Sam Holland, assisted by Cory Bice, at Conway Recording Studios in Los Angeles. Swift's vocals were produced by Max Martin.

Music and lyrics

Music critics described "Out of the Woods" as a 1980s-influenced synth-pop song. Hannah Mylrea from NME noted influences of indietronica. The song features pulsing synthesizers, loud drums, and echoing background vocals that gradually build up towards the end. Compared to other tracks of 1989, "Out of the Woods" features a denser production. Antonoff took inspiration from the music of rock band My Morning Jacket: "every sound is louder than the last ... It started out big, and then I think the obvious move would have been to do a down chorus, but the idea was to keep pushing."

The lyrics are about a fragile romance, inspired by the anxieties Swift experienced from a tumultuous relationship. In the refrain, Swift repeats the line, "Are we out of the woods yet?" over and over, indicating her desire to stabilize the relationship. Swift ponders over its inevitable end: "Your necklace hanging from my neck the night we couldn't quite forget / When we decided to move the furniture so we could dance / Baby, like we stood a chance." The bridge narrates an accident that requires one of the couple to undergo a surgery: "Remember when you hit the brakes too soon / Twenty stitches in a hospital room." The accident in the bridge was inspired by a snowmobile accident that she and an ex-lover had suffered when they were on a ski trip; she had persuaded the tabloid media to not publicize it. Besides its literal sense, the accident is a metaphor for the relationship's fragility and how the two have to deal with its aftermath. When promoting 1989 in October 2014, Swift remarked that "Out of the Woods" was the song that "best represents [the album]".

Release and commercial performance
On October 13, 2014, Swift premiered 15 seconds of "Out of the Woods" on Good Morning America. Big Machine Records made the song available for download on October 14, 2014, as a promotional single for 1989. It is track number four on 1989, which was released on October 27, 2014, by Big Machine.

Swift premiered the music video for "Out of the Woods" on Dick Clark's New Year's Rockin' Eve, broadcast on December 31, 2015. Big Machine and Republic Records released the song to US pop and hot adult contemporary radio stations on January 19, 2016; it was the sixth single from 1989. In Italy, "Out of the Woods" was released to radio on February 5, 2016, by Universal Music Group.

"Out of the Woods" entered the US Billboard Hot 100 chart dated November 1, 2014, at number 18, its peak position. It entered the Billboard Digital Songs at number one, becoming Swift's eighth chart topper. After its video premiere on New Year's Rockin' Eve, the song re-appeared on the Hot 100 at number 46. By May 2016, the Recording Industry Association of America (RIAA) had certified it platinum for one million units based on digital sales and streaming. The single peaked within the top 10 on charts of New Zealand (number six) and Canada (number eight). In Australia, the song peaked at number 19 on the singles chart and was certified gold by the Australian Recording Industry Association (ARIA). The track was certified silver by the British Phonographic Industry (BPI) and platinum by the International Federation of the Phonographic Industry (IFPI) in Norway.

Critical reception
Upon the release of 1989, music critics compared the 1980s-influenced production of "Out of the Woods" to the music of 1980s musicians including Phil Collins and Madonna. Sam Lansky from Time, Jason Lipshutz from Billboard, Brian Mansfield from USA Today, and Lindsay Zoladz from Vulture praised the production for showcasing Swift's expanding artistry beyond her previous country styles. In a review of 1989 for the Los Angeles Times, Mikael Wood deemed "Out of the Woods" one of the album highlights, describing it as the most authentic tribute to the 1980s synth-pop sound that Swift tried to recreate on the album.

Other reviews complimented Swift's lyrical craftsmanship and storytelling, which she had honed on her previous country songs. Lipshutz remarked that although the song was a musical departure for Swift, it was a reminder of her abilities to present "striking, instantly unforgettable images". Writing for The Independent, Andy Gill argued that the intricate lyrics capturing "dramatic emotional change in a few striking lines" of "Out of the Woods" were rare for a pop song. Carl Wilson, in a 1989 review for Slate, picked it as his favorite off the album, highlighting both the detailed lyrics and the production. Esther Zuckerman of Entertainment Weekly deemed the production generic, but highlighted the lyrics as a testament to Swift's ability to offer emotional engagement in her songs.

"Out of the Woods" ranked at number 94 on Pitchforks list of the 100 Best Tracks of 2014. In retrospective reviews, Mylrea and Nate Jones from Vulture complimented the song's production and emotional sentiments, but Rob Sheffield from Rolling Stone was less enthusiastic, feeling that the production overwhelms the intricate lyrics. NME, honoring Antonoff with the Songwriter Award in 2022, selected "Out of the Woods" as one of his best songs.

Music video
Joseph Kahn directed the music video for "Out of the Woods". The video's filming locations in New Zealand included Bethells Beach and the mountains of Queenstown. During the filming, a severe storm struck, causing a one-week delay. Conservationists in the area claimed that the production team breached their permit and endangered a rare native bird by using up to 12 vehicles, an accusation that Swift's crew denied.

The video shows Swift battling to get out of a forest, interpreting the title literally. Swift is seen struggling to escape a magical forest while being chased by a pack of wolves as animate roots constantly follow her. She then finds herself in different natural settings like snowy mountains, an ocean, a barren landscape, a muddy location, and a burning forest. At the end of the video, the woods disappear as she finds a beach, where another version of her is standing by the shore as she reaches for her. The video ends with the caption "She lost him, but she found herself, and somehow that was everything," which is a hidden message written in the booklet of 1989.

Kahn said that Swift "suffered for the art"; she did not employ a double stunt and did all the action, such as crawling through the mud or running through the snow, by herself. Media publications remarked on the video's visual effects and cinematic storytelling. Amanda Bell from MTV News compared the video's cinematic quality to the Harry Potter series, and commented that the video's message "serves as a clear metaphor for her very public relationship history and how she transformed each conflict into her own personal victories, one in particular".

Live performances and covers

During promotion of 1989, Swift performed "Out of the Woods" on televised shows including Jimmy Kimmel Live!, The Ellen DeGeneres Show, and Good Morning America. She performed the song as part of the "1989 Secret Sessions", live streamed by iHeartRadio and Yahoo! on October 27, 2014, the same day the album was released. On the 1989 World Tour in 2015, Swift included the song as the penultimate number on the regular set list. Swift played a stripped-down rendition of "Out of the Woods" on piano at the Grammy Museum in Los Angeles on September 30, 2015; John Blistein from Rolling Stone praised this version over the synth-pop production for better conveying the emotional sentiments of the lyrics.

On December 3, 2015, she sang the song on piano at Hamilton Island in Australia as part of a Nova 96.9 radio program. Swift performed "Out of the Woods" as the opening number to the 58th Annual Grammy Awards on February 15, 2016. She also included the song in the set lists of her shows at the Formula 1 Grand Prix in Austin on October 22, 2016, and DirecTV's pre-Super Bowl event Super Saturday Night in Houston on February 4, 2017. During her 2018 Reputation Stadium Tour, Swift performed an acoustic version of "Out of the Woods" at the shows in Toronto and Auckland.

Rock singer Ryan Adams recorded a country folk-oriented cover of "Out of the Woods" for his track-by-track cover of Swift's 1989. Yahoo! writer Oscar Gracey said that the cover "makes us want to hike through a forest, find a clearing, and mourn the relationships that didn't quite work out", and The A.V. Club Annie Zaleski viewed that Adams's acoustic production "exacerbates the song's uncertainty about a relationship's status".

Credits and personnel
Credits are adapted from the liner notes of 1989.
Taylor Swift – vocals, songwriter, producer
Jack Antonoff – producer, songwriter, guitar, electric guitar, bass, keyboards, drums, background vocals
Laura Sisk – recording
Brendan Morawski – recording assistant
Serban Ghenea – mixing
John Hanes – mix engineer
Tom Coyne – mastering
Sam Holland – recording
Cory Bice – recording assistant
Max Martin – vocal producer

Charts

Weekly charts

Certifications

Release history

Promotional release

Single release

See also
 List of number-one digital songs of 2014 (Canada)
 List of number-one digital songs of 2014 (U.S.)

References

Source

External link

2014 songs
2016 singles
Big Machine Records singles
Taylor Swift songs
Song recordings produced by Jack Antonoff
Song recordings produced by Taylor Swift
Song recordings produced by Max Martin
Songs written by Jack Antonoff
Songs written by Taylor Swift
Music videos directed by Joseph Kahn
American synth-pop songs
Ryan Adams songs